The 1975 Devastation Glacier landslide was a massive rock avalanche that originated from Devastation Glacier on the southern flank of the Mount Meager massif on July 22, 1975.

References

Devastation Glacier
Natural disasters in British Columbia
Mount Meager massif
1975 in British Columbia
Devastation Glacier landslide
20th-century volcanic events
1975 disasters in Canada